Korremula is a village 
owner late k Surrender reddy  Ranga Reddy district in Telangana, India. It falls under Ghatkesar mandal. Korremula is an upcoming residential and commercial suburban area due its close proximity to Singapore Township and Raheja Mindspace. The Outer Ring Road, Hyderabad is passing through this village, developing like urban area.

Bus routes include: 283, and 283s

Villages in Ranga Reddy district